The Away from Home Tour, also marketed as the Light Dreams and Nightmares Tour, was the first headlining concert tour by Canadian recording artist, Drake. 

The tour began on April 5, 2010 in Slippery Rock, Pennsylvania and continued until November 6, 2010 with its final show scheduled in Las Vegas. Scheduled for 78 performances across the United States and Canada, the tour was also utilized as a part of an environmentally friendly campaign alongside non-profit organization Reverb.

The tour marks Drake's first concert tour after signing with Young Money Entertainment, as well as his first tour where he serves as the headline act. The concert tour, which featured k-os and Francis & The Lights as initial opening acts, is in support of Drake's debut studio album and extended play, Thank Me Later and So Far Gone, respectively. Most of the track-list from these projects were performed, such as singles "Best I Ever Had", "I'm Goin' In", "Successful" and concert closer "Over". Additional singles where Drake acts as a featured artist were also performed, including "I Invented Sex", "BedRock", and "Forever". Despite bookings for a European leg of the tour, it was ultimately scrapped in favor of domestic support of the projects.

The tour had a total gross of over $8 million off of 78 shows, making it one of the highest-grossing hip-hop tours of 2010.

Background
Drake and Reverb would announce that the Away from Home Tour would be expanded to various colleges throughout the United States.

Dubbed the "Campus Consciousness" leg of the tour, the organization would work with Drake in order to minimize the output of fossil fuels during the tour. By incorporating the use of biodiesel as well as introducing biodegradable and recyclable products throughout the tour, tents that featured green technology sought to teach students about carbon emissions and promote eco-consumer sampling.

Musical additions

Opening acts
k-os (United States — Leg 1)
Francis & The Lights (United States — Leg 1)
P. Reign (Canada)
Clipse (United States — Leg 4)
Tyga (Bloomington)

Setlist
"Forever"
"Unstoppable"
"Uptown"
"Lust for Life"
"Houstatlantavegas"
"November 18th"
"Fireworks"
"Killers"
"Money to Blow" / "Big Tymers" / "I'm Still Fly"
"I'm Goin' In"
"Every Girl / "Bedrock" / "Throw It In the Bag"
"Un-Thinkable (I'm Ready)"
"A Night Off"
"Successful"
"Fear"
"Say Something"
"I Invented Sex"
"Best I Ever Had"
"Over"

Tour dates 

Festivals and other miscellaneous performances

Campus Consciousness Tour
New Orleans Jazz & Heritage Festival
Bamboozle Festival
Spring Fling
WWKX Hot Night
Hot Jam 9
JAM'N 94.5 Summer Jam
Summer Jam
Super Jam 3
Sounds like Paper
KUBE 93 Summer Jam
Ottawa Bluesfest
Indiana State Fair
Bumbershoot
Aggie Homecoming Concert
Powerhouse 2010
Monster Jam
Voodoo Music + Arts Experience

Cancellations and rescheduled shows

References

2010 concert tours
Drake (musician) concert tours